The state of human rights in Qatar is a concern for several non-governmental organisations, such as Human Rights Watch, which reported in 2012 that hundreds of thousands of mostly South Asian migrant workers in construction in Qatar risk serious exploitation and abuse, sometimes amounting to forced labour. Awareness grew internationally after Qatar's selection to stage the 2022 FIFA World Cup, and some reforms have since taken place, including two sweeping changes in 2020.

Domestic servants, who are often poor women from South-east Asian countries, have few rights, and can become victims of human trafficking, sometimes forced into prostitution. There are restrictions on individual rights such as freedom of expression, and sodomy laws exist to punish offenders, both male and female. Qatar's legal system is a mixture of civil law and Islamic law. Flogging is enforced as a punishment, and capital punishment, although rare in recent times, was enforced in 2020 for the first time in 17 years.

The National Human Rights Committee was established in 2002 to investigate abuses.

Legal system and punishment
Sharia is a main source of Qatari legislation according to Qatar's constitution. Sharia is applied to laws pertaining to family law, inheritance, and several criminal acts (including adultery, robbery and murder). In some cases in Sharia-based family courts, a woman's testimony is worth half a man's and in some cases a female and male testimony is not accepted at all if the witness is not deemed reliable. Codified family law was introduced in 2006. In practice, Qatar's legal system is a mixture of civil law and Islamic law.

The Qatar delegation to the UNHCR claimed that flogging sentences are not given in Qatar, though Amnesty International reports unnamed "foreign nationals" being given flogging sentences as a punishment for alcohol consumption or illicit sexual relations. The US Department of State reported that in 2019 there were 375 cases of flogging as a punishment.   In April 2013, a Muslim expatriate was sentenced to 40 lashes for alcohol consumption. In June 2014, a Muslim expatriate was sentenced to 40 lashes for consuming alcohol and driving under the influence. Judicial corporal punishment is common in Qatar due to the Hanbali interpretation of Sharia.

Stoning is no longer a legal punishment in Qatar, and has never been used. Apostasy is a crime punishable by the death penalty in Qatar. Blasphemy is punishable by up to seven years in prison and proselytizing any religion other than Islam can be punished by up to 10 years in prison. Homosexuality is a crime punishable in sharia by the death penalty for Muslims, though in Qatar the penalty for consenting males is up to 5 years in prison.

Alcohol consumption is partially legal in Qatar; some five-star luxury hotels are allowed to sell alcohol to their non-Muslim customers. Muslims are not allowed to consume alcohol in Qatar, and Muslims caught consuming alcohol are liable to flogging or deportation. Non-Muslim expatriates can obtain a permit to purchase alcohol for personal consumption. The Qatar Distribution Company (a subsidiary of Qatar Airways) is permitted to import alcohol and pork; it operates the one and only liquor store in the country, which also sells pork to holders of liquor licences. Qatari officials have also indicated a willingness to allow alcohol in "fan zones" at the 2022 FIFA World Cup.

Up until December 2011, restaurants on the Pearl-Qatar (a man-made island near Doha) were allowed to serve alcoholic drinks, but they were then told to stop selling alcohol. No explanation was given for the ban. Speculation about the reason includes the government's desire to project a more pious image in advance of the country's first election of a royal advisory body, and rumours of a financial dispute between the government and the resort's developers.

In 2014, Qatar launched a modesty campaign to remind tourists of the modest dress code. Female tourists are advised not to wear leggings, miniskirts, sleeveless dresses and short or tight clothing in public. Men are advised against wearing only shorts and singlets.

As of 2014, certain provisions of the Qatari Criminal Code allows punishments such as flogging and stoning to be imposed as criminal sanctions. The UN Committee Against Torture found that these practices constituted a breach of the obligations imposed by the UN Convention Against Torture. Qatar retains the death penalty, mainly for threats against national security.

Labour

Slavery

According to the US State Department, expatriate workers from nations throughout Asia and parts of Africa are routinely subjected to forced labour and, in some instances, prostitution. Most of these people voluntarily migrate to Qatar as low-skilled labourers or domestic servants, but are subsequently subjected to conditions indicative of involuntary servitude. Some of the more common labour rights violations include beatings, withholding of payment, charging workers for benefits which are nominally the responsibility of the amir, severe restrictions on freedom of movement (such as the confiscation of passports, travel documents, or exit permits), arbitrary detention, threats of legal action, and sexual assault. Many migrant workers arriving for work in Qatar have paid exorbitant fees to recruiters in their home countries – a practice that makes workers highly vulnerable to forced labour once in Qatar.

A 2012 report by Human Rights Watch concluded that hundreds of thousands of mostly South Asian migrant workers in construction in Qatar risk serious exploitation and abuse, sometimes amounting to forced labour. In 2020, Human rights Watch drafted out a report that claimed the nation’s initiatives in labor market by allowing migrant workers to change job without employer permission and setting a higher and non-discriminatory minimum wage. Also the report included data regarding enforcement of rudimentary midday summer working hours ban.

Like other Persian Gulf nations, Qatar has sponsorship laws, which have been widely criticised as "modern-day slavery." Under the provisions of Qatar's sponsorship law, sponsors have the unilateral power to cancel workers' residency permits, deny workers' ability to change employers, report a worker as "absconded" to police authorities, and deny permission to leave the country. As a result, sponsors may restrict workers' movements and workers may be afraid to report abuses or claim their rights, which contribute to their forced labour situation.

Domestic servants are particularly vulnerable to trafficking since they are isolated inside homes and are not covered under the provisions of the labour law, but some reforms introduced in September 2020 extend to all workers, including those for ending employment contracts and changing jobs. Qatar is also a destination for women who migrate for legitimate purposes and subsequently become involved in prostitution, but the extent to which these women are subjected to forced prostitution is unknown. Some of these victims may be runaway domestic workers who have fallen prey to forced prostitution by individuals who exploit their illegal status.

The Government states that it is doing a good job with regards to human rights and treatment of labourers. The National Human Rights Commission (NHRC) was established in 2002 to safeguard and consolidate human rights for everyone subject to the jurisdiction under the state. In a bid to combat Human trafficking, Sheikha Mozah bint Nasser Al-Missned established the Qatar Foundation on Combating Human Trafficking (QFCHT).  To promote more awareness in this area, the Ritz-Carlton Doha, created the World's largest Cake for the QFCHT Sculpture.

Qatari contracting agency Barwa is building a residential area for labourers known as Barwa Al Baraha (also called Workers City). The project was launched after a recent scandal in Dubai's Labor camps, and aims to provide a reasonable standard of living as defined by the new Human Rights Legislation. The overall cost of the project is estimated at around $1.1 billion and will be an integrated city in the Industrial area of Doha. Along with 4.25 square metres of living space per person, the residential project will provide recreational areas and services for labourers. Phase one of the project is set to be completed at the end of 2008 while all phases will be complete by mid 2010.

Qatar Airways, the country's national airline, has long been criticised for its treatment of its lower level employees including flight attendants. Abuses include firing employees without apparent reason, low wages, overworking hours. Employees have been reported to be unlawfully detained by the airline without charge. Deportations by the airline of its employees to their home countries without reason have been reported.

In 2019, a Qatari diplomat working as a medical attaché since 2007 at the Qatar embassy in London was accused of racially discriminating against pensioner working at the embassy and treating him like his "personal slave". The diplomat, Abdullah Al Ansari, accepted that Mohamoud Ahmed, the pensioner, would perform tasks such as fetching Al Ansari's shopping, dropping off his dry cleaning and picking up his children from school during the week.

In 2021 the Foreign Ministry issued guidance for citizens travelling abroad with servants, nannies or drivers.

FIFA World Cup preparations and reported abuses

The construction boom in Qatar began well in advance of Qatar winning the hosting rights to the 2022 FIFA World Cup. When the Emir Sheikh Hamad Al Thani took control of Qatar from his father in 1995 he opened Qatar up to foreign investment. He began the construction of the world's biggest LNG terminals in Ras Laffan with the granting of concessions to ExxonMobil, Royal Dutch Shell and Total S.A. Over 100,000 workers were brought into the country to build Ras Laffan. An estimated 1 million workers, with Qatar's total population being 2 million, are currently living in Qatar helping to build the country. In 1995, when Sheikh Hamad took control, the total migrant population was around 370,000.

In 2013, Amnesty International published reports showing that unpaid migrant workers were left to go hungry.  According to the report, workers are being "treated like cattle." According to a report by the Guardian, based on documents obtained at the Nepalese embassy in Qatar, dozens of Nepalese migrant labourers had died in Qatar within the span of a few weeks around September 2013, and thousands more were enduring appalling labour abuses. According to their analysis, current construction practices will have resulted in over 4,000 deaths by the time of the 2022 event. This figure is denied by the Qatari authorities, who argue that it is misleading since it includes all causes of death in a population of close to one million and over an eight-year period. As of December 2013, FIFA has investigated but taken no action to force Qatar to improve worker conditions.

British law firm DLA Piper was instructed in 2012 by Sheikha Moza bint Nasser, President of Qatar Foundation, to undertake a review of migrant worker conditions. Following the recommendations made, Qatar Foundation created the Migrant Workers Welfare Charter, which applies minimum requirements with respect to the recruitment, living and working conditions, as well as the general treatment of workers engaged in construction and other projects. The mandatory standards will be incorporated into agreements between Qatar Foundation and all its contractors, who are required to comply with the requirements and rules. Contractors and sub-contractors found to be violating the regulations have been blacklisted from future tenders.

The Supreme Committee for Delivery and Legacy, the 2022 World Cup organising committee, followed this measure in mid-2014 with its own regulations and blacklisted a number of companies.  A BBC reporting crew was jailed for two days without charge, after attempting to meet migrant workers.

In August 2015, the Ministry of Labour announced that all companies in Qatar would be required to pay their employees by electronic transfers. The rule is aimed at contractors who withhold salaries or make late payments.

The Department for Human Rights at the Ministry of Labour, and the National Committee for Human Rights are responsible for the monitoring of abuses in Qatar.

In January 2022, the National Human Rights Committee (NHRC) launched "Together We Work" campaign to spread the awareness about knowledge of workers' rights and duties. The campaign highlighted legal amendments in Qatar legislation which affirmed the protection of workers' rights.

On 16 March 2022, FIFA and the Ministry of Labour met in order to discuss the reforms taking place in Qatar's labour market. According to the latest report drafted by ESPN, FIFA President Gianni Infantino said, “I am pleased to see the strong commitment from the Qatari authorities to ensure the reforms are fully implemented across labor market”.

Impact of the World Cup 
Qatar becoming the destination for the 2022 World Cup escalated the issue of human rights for migrant workers. Between 500,000 and 1.5 million migrant workers were employed to build the stadium. About 1,200 migrants died during the project between 2010 and 2013. The Qatar government did not take ownership of these deaths. Migrant workers involved in the world cup were forced into labor, some human trafficked, and kept against their will. Conditions of labor and number of wages was exaggerated to attract laborers; this requirement practice was not regulated by any organization.

Contractors advertise the work and rates.Qatar uses the kafala system. This system gives the network (in this case the contractor) the power to decide the treatment of the migrant workers and how they operate. The government does not get involved in the treatment. Workers were given dirty living conditions with 12 to one room and were often left with no food or pay. FIFA has changed executive members and added more people to their committee because of what has happened in Qatar.

Amid constant human rights criticisms, Qatar introduced migrant reforms that are applied to workers of all sections, including domestic workers, regardless of their nationality. These new reforms came into effect from March 2021. In August 2020 Qatar abolished the Kafala system and introduced labor reforms. Under these reforms workers can change jobs without employer’s permission and are now paid a basic minimum wage regardless of their nationality. The basic minimum wage is set at 1,000 QAR. Allowances for food and accommodation must be provided by employers, which are 300 QAR and 500 QAR respectively.

Qatar introduced a wage protection system to ensure the employers are complying with the reforms. The wage protection system monitors the workers in the private sector. This new system has reduced wage abuses and disputes among migrant labours.

According to Amnesty international, in two different investigations on the working conditions of migrant workers, it was found that 94% of workers in Qatar are foreign nationals. Journalists found their conditions far below human standards. The workers were placed in poor communities, often without basic amenities such as running water, sewage or electricity.

Immigrant labour and human trafficking
Qatar is a destination for men and women from South Asia and Southeast Asia who migrate willingly, but are subsequently trafficked into involuntary servitude as domestic workers and labourers, and, to a lesser extent, commercial sexual exploitation. The most common offence was forcing workers to accept worse contract terms than those under which they were recruited. Other offences include bonded labour, withholding of pay, restrictions on movement, arbitrary detention, and physical, mental, and sexual abuse.

According to the "Trafficking in Persons" report by the U.S. State Department, men and women who are lured into Qatar by promises of high wages are often forced into underpaid labour. The report states that Qatari laws against forced labour are rarely enforced, and that labour laws often result in the detention of victims in deportation centers, pending the completion of legal proceedings. The report places Qatar at tier 3, as one of the countries that neither satisfies the minimum standards, nor demonstrates significant efforts to come into compliance.

In a US State Department's report in 2021, Qatar government showcased an increase in its anti-trafficking capacity and was upgraded to a Tier-2 level nation. The strategies included reporting its first forced labour conviction under the anti-trafficking law, identifying victims and referring them to care at the new trafficking shelter.

The government maintains that it is setting the benchmark when it comes to human rights and treatment of labourers.

In common with other Arab countries of the Persian Gulf, employment sponsorship laws exist in Qatar. These laws have been widely described as akin to modern-day slavery. The sponsorship system (kafeel or kafala) exists throughout the GCC, apart from Bahrain, and means that a worker (not a tourist) may not enter the country without having a kafeel. They cannot leave without the kafeel permission. An exit permit must first be awarded by the sponsor, or kafeel. The sponsor has the right to ban the employee from entering Qatar within 2–5 years of his first departure. Various governmental sponsors have exercised their right to prevent employees from leaving the country, effectively holding them against their will for no good reason.

Some individuals after resigning have not been issued with exit permits, denying them the right to leave the country. Many sponsors do not allow the transfer of one employee to another sponsor. This does not apply to special sponsorship of a Qatar Financial Center-sponsored worker, where it is encouraged and regulated that sponsorship should be uninhibited and assistance should be given to allow for such transfers of sponsorship.

In May 2014, Ali bin Samikh al-Marri, Chairman of Qatar's National Human Rights Committee (NHRC), said that Doha had officially announced the end of the current sponsorship system, and had passed a new law replacing it with a new one in which contracts are signed between the workers and their employers. The exit permit was replaced with a new electronic system that will be managed by the Interior Ministry. The consequences of employers violating this system are subject to a fine of nearly $15,000.

Two laws protecting workers' rights, which included clauses on maximum working hours and rights to annual leave, were passed in August 2017. In November 2017, the United Nations' International Labour Organization (ILO) praised Qatar's commitment to workers rights protection.

In 2018, Sheikh Tamim passed Law No. 13 of 2018, abolishing exit visas for roughly 95% of the country's migrant workers. The remaining 5% of workers, which amount to approximately 174,000 people, still require their employer's permission to exit the country. While stating that more needs to be done to protect the rights of Qatar's workers, Stephen Cockburn of Amnesty claimed that the Amir had taken an "important first step towards meeting the authorities' promise to fundamentally reform the exploitative sponsorship system".

Labour reforms 
In October 2017, Human Rights Watch praised Qatar's commitment to developing laws in line with international labour standards and the guidance of the International Labour Organization. Human Rights Watch said that Qatar had conducted a series of significant labour reforms to institute a minimum wage, to allow independent experts to monitor labour practices, and to reform the kafala system. The ILO said that Qatar is always seeking to be an ideal model for workers' rights. Human Rights Watch called on Gulf countries to follow the example of Qatar and to enhance the situation of migrant labour.

In November 2017, Qatar and the International Labour Organization started a technical cooperation programme to improve working conditions and labour rights. The ILO opened its first project office in Qatar on 30 April 2018 to support the implementation of the programme.

In January 2020, Qatar ended its exit visas requirement under the kafala system for all migrant workers. The ILO welcomed the move and appreciated the Qatari government, saying, "The removal of exit permits is an important milestone in the government's labour reform agenda".

Labour reforms were introduced in September 2020, including allowing for migrant workers to change their jobs without first obtaining permission from their employer. The minimum wage was raised, which would apply to workers of all nationalities. The ability to change jobs, which effectively dismantles the kafala system, is regarded as a very significant change, as it underpins the system of forced labour. Although domestic servants are not covered by general labour laws, the new rules about changing jobs and terminating contracts apply to them also.

Still awaiting reform is the unfair situation caused by the requirement that it is the employers of migrant workers who enable their entry, residence, and employment permits, but it is the workers who are punished if the employer fails to do the necessary paperwork.

In April 2020, the government of Qatar provided $824 million to pay the wages of migrant workers in quarantine or undergoing treatment for COVID-19.

In August 2020, the Qatari government announced a monthly minimum wage for all workers of 1,000 riyals (US$275), an increase from the previous temporary minimum wage of 750 riyals a month. The new laws went into effect in March 2021. The International Labour Organization said "Qatar is the first country in the region to introduce a non-discriminatory minimum wage, which is a part of a series of historical reforms of the country's labour laws,"

The campaign group Migrant Rights said the new minimum wage was too low to meet migrant workers' need with Qatar's high cost of living. Employers are obligated to pay 300 riyals for food and 500 riyals for accommodation, if they do not provide employees with these directly. The No Objection Certificate was removed so that employees can change jobs without consent of the current employer. A Minimum Wage Committee was formed to check on the implementation.

Mental health 
A problem in Qatar is a stigma behind mental health issues and how they are dealt with. Breaking new ground, Qatar joined the WHO's Mental Health Action Plan, which spanned 2013-2020. This plan, "recognizes the essential role of mental health in achieving health for all people" (World Health Organization). In Qatar, mental health typically has a stigma around it, and this was the first time the Qatar government played an active role in mental health awareness.

Studies have been done on the three groups that make up Qatar, which are the labor migrants, white collar migrants, and non-migrants. The odds of depression are significantly increased in the labor migrant and white-collar migrant groups compared to the non-migrant group. One of the explaining factors behind this difference is the quality of life. The thought process is that migrants have to face major life changes and have to adapt to living in Qatar. The 'culture shock' migrants experience is a major contributor to declining mental health.

Qatar is not as current as it could be with mental health services. In 2014, about 0.36% of the healthcare budget was spent on mental health services, which is seven times lower than the median for upper-middle-income nations. Major depressive disorder (20.4%) and generalized anxiety disorder (19.1%) are the most frequent cases seen. In undergraduate schooling for medical professions such as doctors and nurses, only 3% of training is dedicated to psychiatry, mental health, and other things related. There are a projected 13.5 mental health professionals per 100,000 population.

Women's rights 

Women in Qatar vote and may run for public office. Qatar enfranchised women at the same time as men in connection with the May 1999 elections for a Central Municipal Council. It was the first Arab country in the Persian Gulf to allow women the right to vote. These elections—the first ever in Qatar—were deliberately held on 8 March 1999, International Women's Day.

Qatar sent female athletes to the 2012 Summer Olympics that began on 27 July in London. 
 
The first female judge in Qatar is Sheikha Maha Mansour Salman Jasim Al Thani. She is a law school graduate from Qatar University and was sworn into the post in 2010.

Labor force participation for women in Qatar is roughly 51%, which is higher than the world average, and is the highest rate in the Arab world.

Gender wage gap 
Both Qatari and non-Qatari women are affected by a widening wage gap. They are paid 25% to 50% less than men, despite the fact that their working hours are comparable. The difference is due in part to the social allowances by government afforded to men as household heads, such as housing and travel allotments, which female employees are less likely to receive.

An April 2022 report by the Federation of American scientists, observed that women in Qatar drive and own property, after reforms made in 2018, enabling women to work in government and the private sector.

In the October 2, 2021, Shura Council elections no women candidates were elected but the Amir included two women among his 15 appointments to the Council for the first time in Shura Council’s history.

Sex outside marriage and abortion 

Qatari women convicted for "illicit relations" (sex outside marriage) may be imprisoned for up to seven years, although usually the courts decide on one year. It is often poor domestic workers from South-east Asian countries who are convicted, even when they have been raped if the judge thinks they are lying.

Many women who get pregnant with an illegitimate child are jailed. Non-citizens who are forced to have sponsors are usually denied the right to leave Qatar and are therefore forced to seek refuge and counsel from their embassy. Despite the effort of embassies, many still land in jail. According to Najeeb al-Nuaimi, a criminal lawyer and former justice minister of Qatar, many women are able to avoid or be released from prison by marrying the father of their baby, at which point the woman is allowed to leave the country with her husband.

In October 2020, several women who were boarding flights from Doha were taken away to undergo invasive gynaecological examinations, after an abandoned newborn baby had been found in the airport toilets and officials were searching for the mother in order to punish her. This caused a diplomatic incident.

Other issues
A number of women have fled Qatar for the UK because of abuse. For example, Noof Al Maadeed left for the UK because her parents tried to force her to get married against her will. Another lady, Aisha Al Qahtani fled because her father is a senior military officer who abused her and there is little justice for her.

The fears concerning Noof Al Maadeed's safety heightened when she spoke of receiving threats on October 13 and mysteriously vanished after returning to Qatar from the UK. Rumours suggested that she had been killed in government custody. The female Qatari activist later appeared in a series of videos and announced her health and safety on Twitter.

A source briefed on the situation told AFP that Qatari authorities were providing assistance to Maadeed, who was being cared for at a safe, undisclosed location.

Migrant women 
Migrant women are typically seen as a "dual minority" because of their gender and foreignness. According to a real account from a female migrant worker, "I felt estranged twice, one for not being a man, secondly for not being able to become one of the Arabs". These women have created a new classification term, FW-W for "foreign working-woman". The overlap of these identities cause this group of women to slip through the cracks unnoticed. Foreign women make up about 20 per cent of the total population and they outnumber female citizens by a ratio of nearly 1:4.

Individual rights

Makeup and citizenship of Qatar 
Out of the population of about 2,700,000, about 2 million are men and the rest are female. Over 90% over the population of Qatar are not actually Qatari. Workers come from India, Nepal, Bangladesh, the Philippines, Pakistan, Sri Lanka, Egypt, and more. Out of this migrant population, over half of them have strong depression-like symptoms. With all of these different cultural backgrounds coming together, migrant workers most likely feel lost and have troubling find a place in their life.

New laws passed in 2021 state that only those who have Qatari nationality since birth and are naturalized citizens with a Qatari grandparent can vote. Only those whose nationality is originally Qatari can run in elections. The migrant workers that make up the majority of Qatar are not considered citizens of the country they work so hard for.

Language barriers 
In terms of basic human rights, people of Qatar face obstacles in communication and connection from language barriers. Not everyone in Qatar speaks Arabic and there is a heavy population of migrant workers that speak other languages; basic human rights are affected because of this lack of communication. For instance, access to health care is impacted. A patient that does not speak English or Arabic will have difficulty trying to receive treatment.

Qatar is predominantly made up of foreigners who do not speak the national languages, and they will have trouble in receiving treatment since they cannot voice their issues. Because of the language barrier patients might receive incorrect treatment or the wrong treatment for their ailment, which can make their situation even worse. Besides health care, the other interactions with important institutions that are counterproductive due to a lack of communication. According to the journal, "Patient Perspectives on Languages Discordance During Healthcare Visits: Findings From the Extremely High-Density Multicultural State of Qatar", addressing the work force of Qatar, "Qatar, … heavily in the development of its healthcare infrastructure in recent years to keep pace with rapid economic expansion. The expatriate population living and working in the country constitutes 94.14% of the total workforce (Qatar Permanent Population Committee, 2011)".

The majority of workers who control the forward progression of advancements of Qatar do not speak the national language. Migrant labor workers are the backbone of the country and those who are in charge of them probably cannot even communicate with them. The language barriers also create cultural and ethnic divides. About 90% of Qatar's population is made of non-citizens. Qatar has the highest population of migrants in the world and 94% of its economically active population are not Qatari natives.

Capital punishment 
Qatar has the death penalty, primarily for espionage, or other threats against national security. Apostasy, same-sex intercourse, and blasphemy are considered capital offences, but there have been no recorded applications of the death penalty for this charge.

Others crimes like murder, violent robbery resulting in death, arson, torture, kidnapping, terrorism, rape, drug trafficking, extortion by threat of accusation of a crime of honor, perjury causing wrongful execution, and treason carry a possible death sentence. However, the most recent executions that took place in Qatar were both for murder (in March 2003 and May 2020).

Capital punishment in Qatar is done by a firing squad. Executions are rare. The last execution occurred in May 2020, after a 17-year hiatus. The executee was a murderer from Nepal.

Corporal punishment 
Flogging is used in Qatar as a punishment for alcohol consumption or illicit sexual relations. According to Amnesty International, in 2012 at least six foreign nationals were sentenced to floggings of either 40 or 100 lashes.

People convicted of sodomy can face imprisonment of up to three years. Muslims convicted of zina (unlawful sexual intercourse such as adultery and bestiality) can be sentenced to flogging. Non-Muslims can face imprisonment in such cases.

Freedom of expression 

Freedom of expression is the political right to communicate one's opinions and ideas. A life sentence was handed to the Qatari poet Mohammed al-Ajami, also known as Mohammed Ibn al-Dheeb, for criticism of the government during the 2012 United Nations Climate Change Conference in Qatar. Observers were not allowed to enter the court, and al-Ajami himself was not present at the sentencing. All the information available points to Mohammed al-Ajami being a prisoner of conscience who had been placed behind bars solely for his words. Al-Ajami was released from prison in March 2016 after a royal pardon commuted his sentence.

A cyber law which passed in late September 2014 severely limited freedom of speech and freedom of expression rights, granting the government and authorities the ability to punish "content that may harm the country" with jail time of up to 3 years, and fines around 500,000 QR. The law states that the authority may in each individual case judge whether the content is suitable or not. No guidelines or references are currently available to say what type of content is allowed.

In July 2020, Qatar International Centre for Conciliation and Arbitration (QICCA) board member for International Relations Sheikh Dr Thani bin Ali al-Thani claimed that Qatar’s legislation and laws “highly support sophisticated media activity,” guarantee freedom of opinion and expression, press and media freedom.

Residency and naturalisation 
The Qatari government is keen to maintain things as they are, and are concerned about a change in its conservative cultural values, so there are few ways to achieve citizenship through naturalisation. One way is through marriage to a Qatari citizen, but this does not guarantee it, especially for non-Muslims. Upon occasion, an employer can reward a good and longstanding worker who has benefited the company in a major way by ensuring a work and residence permit for them, but this is annually renewable until the employee's 60th birthday, and only in exceptional circumstances could this be extended to reside indefinitely in Qatar (although never attaining citizenship). Children of foreigners born in Qatar have to assume their parents' nationality; if one parent is Qatari, there is a path to citizenship, but it is not immediate.

Apart from fear of cultural influences, there are concerns about increased expenditure on new citizens; the government provides free education, healthcare, and housing loans for all of its citizens. Another concern is the maintenance of Qatar's political system, based on dynastic succession.

A few foreign residents, who must be able to speak Arabic and lived in Qatar for a minimum of 25 years consecutively, may win citizenship if approved by the Emir. Elite athletes, recruited by the state in order to compete in the Olympics under the Qatari flag, have been granted citizenship in the past.

The situation has long been debated, with especially younger Qataris questioning the restrictive laws, but analysts have suggested that as Qatar's economy becomes less dependent on oil, things might change, as "Qatar will need to attract long-term residents who can contribute to the tax base and support what will eventually become an aging population".

LGBT rights in Qatar 

Sodomy between consenting adults (regardless of gender) in Qatar is illegal, and subject to a sentence of up to five years in prison. The law is silent about sodomy between consenting female adults. Sexual orientation and gender identity are not covered in any civil rights laws and there is no recognition of same-sex marriages, civil unions or domestic partnerships.

Under Sharia Law, homosexuality in Qatar is punishable by death penalty for Muslims. The Amnesty International Report 2008 stated there were no executions for convictions of sexual offences in recent years in Qatar. According to the 2016 ILGA report, the death penalty for same-sex sexual behaviour has not been implemented in Qatar.

The New York Times gay and transgender rights coverage published from April to July 2018 were censored in Qatar. The Doha edition of The New York Times International Edition had large empty areas in the newspaper with a note that the offending articles had been "exceptionally removed". Eight out of nine articles that were censored were on issues affecting the LGBT communities.

In 2016, Polish Instagram star and model King Luxy was arrested and held for two months in Qatar for numerous charges, including extortion, blackmail, and cyber assault. Luxy claimed he was arrested for "wearing makeup on Snapchat and Instagram".

Freedom of religion 

Qatar is a Muslim-majority nation, with 76% of its population adhering to Islam. The government uses Sunni law as the basis of its criminal and civil regulations. However, some measure of religious toleration is granted.  Foreign workers, and tourists, are free to affiliate with other faiths, i.e. Christians, Hindus, Sikhs, Buddhists, and Bahá'ís, as long as they are discreet and do not offend public order or morality.

For example, in March 2008 the Roman Catholic church Our Lady of the Rosary was consecrated in Doha. However, in keeping with the need to be discreet, no missionaries are allowed and the church will not have any bells, crosses or other overtly Christian signs on its exterior.

Although abandoning Islam is considered apostasy, which is an offence subject to the death penalty, Qatar has not imposed any penalty for this offence since its independence in 1971.

Children
Until 2005, children as young as four years old were used as jockeys in camel racing, which is a popular sport in the Gulf region. Children were also being trafficked from other countries, and often starved to keep their body weight down. The sport is a dangerous one, with the danger of hurt in a fall or being trampled underfoot. Robot jockeys created by a Swiss company were introduced to use instead of children when the then Emir of Qatar, Hamad Al Thani, introduced the ban.

Governmental human rights organisations
Law 39, issued in 2005, stipulated the formation of a "bureau for human rights" in the Ministry of Foreign Affairs. One of its main missions is to prepare answers on the claims or reports of foreign countries and organisations on the situation of human rights inside the state.

The National Human Rights Committee was founded in 2002 with the responsibility of overseeing and carrying out investigations on human rights abuses in the country. Their methods of advancing the country's standards of human rights include contributing to research programs related to human rights, conducting studies, and providing advice and recommendations to legislative bodies.

Historical ratings
The following chart shows Qatar's ratings since 1972 in the Freedom in the World reports, published annually by Freedom House. A rating of 1 is "free"; 7, "not free".

See also
Human rights in the Middle East

References

External links
Qatar's foreign domestic workers subjected to slave-like conditions
Broken promises: Qatar's migrant workers caught in the kafala system
Amnesty International 2016/17 report on Qatari Human Rights